James Leo Farrell (7 August 1903 – 24 October 1979) was an Irish rugby player. He was educated at Castleknock College and captained the Castleknock SCT to Leinster Schools Senior Cup success in 1920. He played for Bective Rangers and Ireland (1926–32) and was a member of the British Lions squad on the 1927 British Lions tour to Argentina and the 1930 British Lions tour to New Zealand and Australia

He had four children with his wife Nora (née Folwell), including the artist Micheal Farrell (1940–2000).

References

External links
 Match report Great Britain XV tour – Buenos Aires, 31 July 1927
 Match report Great Britain XV tour – Buenos Aires, 7 August 1927
 Match Report Great Britain XV tour – Buenos Aires, 14 August 1927
 Match report Great Britain XV tour – Buenos Aires, 21 August 1927

Irish rugby union players
Ireland international rugby union players
Rugby union locks
British & Irish Lions rugby union players from Ireland
1903 births
1979 deaths